Songjiang University Town is a station on Shanghai Metro Line 9. It began operation on 29 December 2007. This station is situated in Songjiang University Town.

Railway stations in Shanghai
Shanghai Metro stations in Songjiang District
Railway stations in China opened in 2007
Line 9, Shanghai Metro
Railway stations in China at university and college campuses